The University of Professional Studies, Accra (UPSA) formerly known as Institute of Professional Studies (IPS), is a public university in Ghana. The main campus is located in Accra.  UPSA is the first university in Ghana to provide both academic and business professional education. The University of Professional Studies Act, 2012 (Act 850) changed the name of the Institute of Professional Studies to University of Professional Studies, Accra. UPSA is nationally and internationally accredited by the National Accreditation Board (Ghana) and the Accreditation Council for Business Schools and Programs (ACBSP) respectively.

It introduced the dual qualification scheme for its students ahead of the 2019/20 academic year. With this new system, the students will be required to complete a chartered program such as the ACCA, ICAG, CIM, CIMA, ICSA and others, by the end of their degree study to better enhance their chances of employment in the job market.

History
The university was founded in 1965 as a private professional business education tuition provider and was taken over by government in 1978 by the Institute of Professional Studies Decree, 1978 (SMCD 200). It was subsequently established as a tertiary institution with a mandate to provide tertiary and professional education in Accountancy, Management and other related areas of study by the Institute of Professional Studies Act, (Act 566), 1999.

The then IPS had been offering tuition for business professional programmes. In September 2005, the then institute introduced Bachelor’s degree programmes to give meaning to the IPS Act 566. It received a Presidential Charter in September 2008, conferring on it the status of a fully-fledged public university. The University offers undergraduate and post-graduate degrees in several programmes.

The development of the programmes coupled with trends in tertiary education at both local and international levels called for an amendment of the existing Act 566 of 1999. Subsequently, the University of Professional Studies Act, 2012 (ACT 850) was enacted to rename the institute as University of Professional Studies, Accra (UPSA).

UPSA has recently introduced “dual qualification scheme” for student for the 2019/2020 academic year. The policy is to make students who enroll in a degree programme to simultaneously and compulsorily pursue a corresponding professional programme such as ACCA, ICAG, CIM, CIMA, ICSA among others as an additional course thus graduating with both a degree and a chartered certificate.

Vice-Chancellor, Professor Abednego Feehi Okoe Amartey explained the new policy at the 11th Congregation of the University . 

In September 2020, President Nana Akufo-Addo commissioned a 500-seat capacity artificial stadium (AstroTurf) in UPSA. The sod for the stadium was cut in July 2019 and constructed by Wembley Sports Construction Company Limited. Aside the artificial football pitch, the facility houses spectator stands with a VIP area, changing rooms, washrooms, storage spaces, flood lighting and Sports Directorate offices for the University. The Vice-Chancellor indicated that the facility is accessible for use by the community.

Office of the Vice-Chancellor 
Prof Abednego Feehi Okoe Amartey 2016- (current Vice-Chancellor of the University of Professional Studies)

Prof Joshua Alabi 2012-2016 (1st Vice-Chancellor of the University of Professional Studies)

Programmes

Undergraduate Programmes

 Bachelor of Arts in Public Relations Management
 Bachelor of Science in Accounting
 Bachelor of Science in Accounting and Finance
 Bachelor of Science in Business Economics
 Bachelor of Science in Actuarial Science
 Bachelor of Business Administration
 Bachelor of Science in Information Technology Management
 Bachelor of Science in Marketing
 Bachelor of Science in Real Estate Management and Finance
 4-Year Bachelor of Laws (LLB)
 3-Year Post First Degree Bachelor of Laws (LLB)

Diplomas 

 Diploma in Accounting
 Diploma in Marketing
 Diploma in Management
 Diploma in Public Relations Management
 Diploma in Information Technology Management

Professional programmes

Association Of Certified Chartered Accountants (ACCA) UK.
Institute of Chartered Accountants, Ghana (ICAG)
Chartered Institute Of Marketing, (CIM) UK.
Chartered Institute Of Management Accountants (CIMA) UK
Institute Of Chartered Secretaries and Administrators (ICSA) UK

Post Graduate Programmes

 Master of Philosophy in Finance
 Master of Philosophy in Leadership
 Master of Business Administration in Accounting and Finance
 Master of Business Administration in Auditing
 Master of Business Administration in Corporate Governance
 Master of Business Administration in Internal Auditing
 Master of Business Administration in Marketing
 Master of Business Administration in Petroleum Accounting and Finance
 Master of Business Administration in Total Quality Management
 Master of Science in Leadership

Notable alumni 

 Joshua Alabi
 Otumfuo Nana Osei Tutu II
 Albert Kan-Dapaah
 Ernest Henry Norgbey
 Stonebwoy
 Eric Oduro Osae
 Xabier Pikaza
 Camidoh

See also
List of universities in Ghana

References

Sources

External links
National Accreditation Board
University of Professional Studies homepage
Study Abroad Ghana
UPSA 11th Congregation

Universities in Ghana
Education in Accra
Educational institutions established in 1965
1965 establishments in Ghana